William Benjamin "Shorty" Fuller (October 10, 1867 – April 11, 1904) was an American professional baseball player who played shortstop in the Major Leagues from  to . Fuller played for the Washington Nationals, St. Louis Browns, and New York Giants.  His brother, Harry Fuller, also played professional baseball.

External links

1867 births
1904 deaths
19th-century baseball players
Major League Baseball shortstops
Washington Nationals (1886–1889) players
St. Louis Browns (AA) players
New York Giants (NL) players
New Orleans Pelicans (baseball) players
Springfield Ponies players
New York Metropolitans (minor league) players
Springfield Maroons players
Detroit Tigers (Western League) players
Baseball players from Cincinnati